Jung Young-a (born 20 July 1979) is a South Korean para table tennis player. She won a bronze medal at the 2012 Summer Paralympics and two bronze medals at the 2016 Summer Paralympics.

Her disability was caused by a fall during a mountain-climbing trip with friends in 2002.

She also competed in wheelchair curling, and represented South Korea at the 2011 World Wheelchair Curling Championship.

References 
 

Living people
1979 births 
Sportspeople from Seoul
South Korean female table tennis players 
Paralympic medalists in table tennis
Table tennis players at the 2012 Summer Paralympics 
Table tennis players at the 2016 Summer Paralympics 
Medalists at the 2012 Summer Paralympics 
Medalists at the 2016 Summer Paralympics 
Paralympic table tennis players of South Korea
Paralympic bronze medalists for South Korea
People with paraplegia
South Korean female curlers
South Korean wheelchair curlers
Table tennis players at the 2020 Summer Paralympics
21st-century South Korean women